Ruby City may refer to the following United States locations:

Ghost towns 
 Ruby City, Idaho
 Ruby City, Nevada
 Ruby City, North Carolina - see List of ghost towns in North Carolina
 Ruby City, Washington - see List of ghost towns in Washington

Other 

 Ruby City (San Antonio) museum in Texas